Centennial Composers Collection is a six-CD box set. Each disc is devoted to one composer of the Great American Songbook and American musical theater genres. The composers of this collection are Richard Rodgers, Duke Ellington, Hoagy Carmichael, George Gershwin, Irving Berlin and Jerome Kern. These discs have also been released individually.

Critical reception
Paula Edelstein of AllMusic writes, "With all due respect to many reissues of classic Broadway tunes by various recording labels, this box set sets a new standard for music that has stood the test of time but is played in a different time and space by a modern woman. Adair is probably the first female to tackle a project of this magnitude and therefore makes this set an innovative jewel in terms of accomplishing "the impossible"; it proves that great works are performed not by strength, but by perseverance."

C. Michael Bailey of All About Jazz starts his review by saying this collection is "A Superb Introduction to the Great American Song Book..." and goes on to say, "This release honors both Ms. Adair and Green Hill Records, each who had the guts to present this grand canon with all of the grace and aplomb of creating high art."

Chet Williamson of Rambles ends his review with this statement:"Those who listen for something edgy and new will not find it here, but what they will hear is something that we don't hear all that much anymore and often take for granted when we do -- classic songs, played with class, verve and taste. Yes, it's all a bit retro, but it's done impeccably, and if it makes you hum along or wish you had a dance floor handy, it's achieved its purpose."

Leonid Auskern of Jazz Square begins his review, "A solid box set with the bold title "Composers of the Century". I must say that in the title there is no advertising stretch, as someone might think."

The Tennessee Jazz & Blues Society did an article about Adair's talk/music radio show on NPR, Improvised Thoughts, and remarked on this release, "Her six-CD Centennial Composers Collection of tunes by Rodgers, Gershwin, Kern, Ellington, Carmichael and Berlin became an instant collectible classic."

Christina Lord of Creations magazine writes, "This is a collection of the best American songs written during the first half of the 20th century. Classic and timeless, this nostalgic treasure is a wonderful gift for yourself or someone you love."

Track listing

Musicians
Beegie Adair –  piano
Roger Spencer – double bass
Chris Brown – percussion

References

External links
Beegie Adair official web site
Green Hill Music official web site

2002 albums